Macroeconomic regulation and control often abbreviated Macro-control refers to the use of direct government intervention by the central government of the People's Republic of China to cool down the overheated economy. The policy was first introduced in 1993 by Zhu Rongji, Premier of the People's Republic of China and Governor of the People's Bank of China at the time. His policies included collective measures to constrain monetary policy, suppress real estate and stock markets, control inflation, lower supplies of raw materials and reduce domestic consumption. The purpose was to achieve a so-called soft landing of an economy that was growing too fast.

As all these  measures can vastly affect the economy and political stability, macro-control has become a hot topic to economic and political observers of the People's Republic of China.

See also
Economy of China
Mixed economy
Socialist economics
Economic regulation
Economic interventionism
Economic integration
Modern China

Economic development in China